The 24th Field Artillery Regiment, Royal Canadian Artillery was a Canadian Army Reserve artillery regiment based  in Trail, British Columbia. It was formed in 1936 when The Kootenay Regiment was converted from infantry to artillery. The regiment currently exists on the Supplementary Order of Battle.

History 

The Kootenay Regiment originated in Fernie, British Columbia, on 1 May 1914, when an eight-company regiment of infantry was authorized to be formed. It was designated the 107th (East Kootenay) Regiment on 2 November 1914.

The 54th Battalion (Kootenay), CEF, was authorized on 7 November 1914 and embarked for Britain on 22 November 1915, and disembarked in France on 14 August 1916. The 54th Battalion fought as part of the 11th Infantry Brigade, 4th Canadian Division in France and Flanders until the end of the war. The battalion was disbanded on 30 August 1920.

The 225th Battalion (Kootenay), CEF, was authorized on 15 July 1916 and embarked for Britain on 26 January 1917, where its personnel were absorbed by the 16th Reserve Battalion, CEF, on 6 February 1917 to provide reinforcements for the Canadian Corps in the field. The battalion was disbanded on 1 September 1917.

Following the Great War it was redesignated The Kootenay Regiment on 12 March 1920. On 15 December 1936 it was converted to artillery and redesignated the 24th (Kootenay) Field Brigade, RCA.

The Kootenay Regiment held the following battle honours. After conversion to artillery, these honours became dormant, being replaced by the RCA's honorary distinction .

24th Field Artillery Regiment, Royal Canadian Artillery 
It was redesignated the 24th Reserve (Kootenay) Field Brigade, RCA, on 7 November 1940; the 24th Reserve (Kootenay) Field Regiment, RCA, on 15 March 1943;  the 24th Field Regiment, RCA, on 1 April 1946; the 24th Heavy Anti- Aircraft Regiment, RCA, on 5 February 1948; the 24th Medium Anti-Aircraft Regiment, RCA, on 22 August 1955; the 24th Medium Anti-Aircraft Artillery Regiment, RCA, on 12 April 1960; and finally the 24th Field Artillery Regiment, RCA, on 10 December 1962.

The 24th Field Artillery Regiment, RCA, perpetuated the 54th Battalion (Kootenay), CEF and the 225th Battalion (Kootenay), CEF.

It was reduced to nil strength and transferred to the Supplementary Order of Battle on 28 February 1965.

Lineage chart

Batteries

24th (Kootenay) Field Brigade, RCA (5 December 1936) 

 107th Field Battery, RCA
 117th Field Battery, RCA
 109th Field Battery, RCA
 108th Field Battery (Howitzer), RCA

24th Field Regiment, RCA (1 April 1946) 

 107th Field Battery, RCA
 109th Field Battery, RCA
 111th Field Battery, RCA

24th Medium Anti-Aircraft Regiment, RCA (22 August 1955) 

 109th Medium Anti-Aircraft Battery, RCA
 111th Medium Anti-Aircraft Battery, RCA

24th Field Artillery Regiment, RCA (10 December 1962) 

 109th Field Battery, RCA
 111th Field Battery, RCA

References

Field artillery regiments of Canada
Military units and formations of British Columbia
Supplementary Order of Battle
Military units and formations established in 1962
Military units and formations disestablished in 1965
Trail, British Columbia